is a train station in Yuni, Yūbari District, Hokkaidō, Japan.

Lines
Yuni Station is served by the Muroran Main Line.

Station layout
The station has two ground-level opposed side platforms serving two tracks. Kitaca is not available. The station is unattended.

Platforms

Adjacent stations

References

Railway stations in Hokkaido Prefecture
Railway stations in Japan opened in 1892